Josephine City Historic District is a national historic district located on either side of Josephine Street in the southeast portion of the town of Berryville, Clarke County, Virginia. It encompasses 38 contributing buildings and 2 contributing sites on 40 acres of land. While most of the district is occupied by single-family dwellings, there are also a church, a parish hall, three former school buildings, and a cemetery. Located in the district and separately listed is the Josephine City School, which now houses the Josephine Community Museum.

Josephine City Historic District was listed on the National Register of Historic Places in May 2015.

References

External links
 

Historic districts in Clarke County, Virginia
National Register of Historic Places in Clarke County, Virginia
Historic districts on the National Register of Historic Places in Virginia